Polusin  is a village in the administrative district of Gmina Świnice Warckie, within Łęczyca County, Łódź Voivodeship, in central Poland.

The village has a population of 40.

References

Polusin